The Santa Rita Abbey is a monastic community of the Trappistine branch of Cistercian nuns located in Sonoita, Arizona, within the Diocese of Tucson.

History
The monastery was founded by Mount Saint Mary's Abbey in Wrentham, Massachusetts in 1972, and erected as a priory in 1978.

The nuns of Santa Rita settled among the vast rolling grasslands of the Coronado National Forest just north of Sonoita, Arizona in the foothills of the Santa Rita mountains.  Their work includes the production of altar breads, and sculpture.  They also offer guest retreat facilities including 6 individual rooms and a small apartment for two people available for visitors who wish to share in the quiet beauty, simplicity, and solitude.

The current Superior is Mother Victoria Murray, O.C.S.O., who was elected in 2012.

See also
Trappists
Cistercian nuns

References

Trappistine monasteries in the United States
Christian organizations established in 1972
Buildings and structures in Santa Cruz County, Arizona
Catholic Church in the United States
20th-century Christian monasteries
1972 establishments in Arizona
History of women in Arizona